The Mérode Cup is a medieval silver-gilt cup decorated with finely engraved birds, fruit and vine leaves made in France in Burgundy in about 1400 and named for the ancient Belgian family of Mérode, to whom it once belonged.

The cup is made of silver-gilt and is decorated with finely engraved birds, fruit and vine leaves. When the cup is placed on a shaft of light it appears to be set with miniature stained glass windows. Pieces decorated with this sort of enamel are known from inventories of people such as the great fourteenth century patron John, Duke of Berry, brother of king Charles V of France. This cup, however, is the only one to survive from this period.

See also
 Royal Gold Cup

Bibliography
 

Collections of the Victoria and Albert Museum
Silver-gilt objects
Drinkware
Works in vitreous enamel
Medieval European metalwork objects